Ignaz Feigerle (7 April 1795 in Biskupstwo, Mähren – 27 September 1863 in Ochsenburg) was a Catholic theologian and bishop of the Diocese of Sankt Pōlten.

Life 
Feigerle studied at Frintaneum in Vienna. In 1825 he became Professor for Pastoral theology at the Palacký University of Olomouc. In 1829 he moved to the University of Vienna, where he became Rector in 1846. In 1851 he became Bishop of St. Pölten. In 1858 he founded Hippolytus, a scholarly journal, which was edited by Matthäus Binder and Anton Kerschbaumer.

Bibliography 

 
 
 Anton Kerschbaumer: Bischof Feigerle, nach dem Leben geschildert, Wien, 1864;  Komplettscan des Buches

1795 births
1863 deaths
19th-century Austrian Roman Catholic theologians
Roman Catholic bishops of Sankt Pölten
19th-century Austrian Roman Catholic priests